, is a Japanese animation studio founded in April 2009, focused on 3DCG and 2D Animation.

History
The company was established on April 30, 2009 after studio Gonzo decided to sell its digital video division to Q-TEC, which then established the company with the resources acquired, along with 25 employees that worked with the previous company then became part of Graphinica, with an initial total of 60 employees when it was created.

On April 1, 2010, absorbed and merged Decoloco (an animation filming/VFX company) of Q-TEC group to the company. On April 1, 2011, it opened the Ogikubo Studio and started 2D drawing animation production.

On December 1, 2017, Graphinica's owner Memory-Tech Holdings announced that they have acquired AOI TYO Holdings' TYO Animations subsidiary, with the company then being put as a subsidiary of Graphinica after the acquisition. In addition, TYO Animations' name was changed to Yumeta Company, reviving a name that was retired in 2009 when the original Yumeta Company merged with Hal Film Maker to form TYO Animations.

On July 3, 2018, Graphinica and Avex Pictures announced that they have jointly established a new company called Flagship Line. According to the companies, the new company will produce anime, game, and VR content and "It will leverage the development and production capabilities of Graphinica, and the planning and operational architecture of Avex Pictures".

Works

Television series

Films

OVAs/ONAs

Other

References

External links

  
 

 
Animation studios in Tokyo
Japanese animation studios
Japanese companies established in 2009
Mass media companies established in 2009